Helen Ticiane Ganzarolli (born 29 September 1979) is a Brazilian television presenter and model.

Career 
She began her career when she moved to the age of twelve to Presidente Venceslau, in the interior of the state of São Paulo, where she participated in several beauty contests and won several titles.

In 1996, when she won a contest called Miss Turismo São Paulo held at the Tourist Resort of Presidente Epitácio, and also participated in the Girl Rodeio Brasil in Barretos, São Paulo, it gained repercussion, which earned her a contract with Ford Models and media exposure, due to fashion shows.

Filmography

Television

As a Stage Assistant

As a Presenter

Cinema

References

External links
 
 

1979 births
Living people
Actresses from São Paulo
Brazilian people of Italian descent
Brazilian television presenters
Brazilian female models
Brazilian women television presenters